The lesser ground robin (Amalocichla incerta) is a species of bird in the family Petroicidae.
It is found in New Guinea.

Description 
It is 15 cm long and is dark brown with paler underparts and a white throat.

References

lesser ground robin
Birds of New Guinea
lesser ground robin
Taxonomy articles created by Polbot